Parish Roads in Louisiana include all public roadways that are controlled and maintained by the local government of the parish in which they are located.

The existence of a system of parish roads signed as touring routes varies greatly by parish.  To most motorists in Louisiana, the only visible parish roads with numerical designations are the few that appear on state-maintained signage at various Interstate Highway exits.

This list includes all nine instances where a parish road intersects an Interstate Highway and features MUTCD standard signage installed by the Louisiana Department of Transportation and Development (La DOTD), the state's highway agency.  It also includes several examples of parish roads that are signed by the state due to their proximity to an Interstate Highway or their status as part of an interstate frontage road.

Caddo Parish Road 16

Caddo Parish Road 16 (PR 16) runs  in an east–west direction from LA 1 north of Myrtis to US 71 in Mira.  It is locally known as Mira Myrtis Road.

PR 16 is only signed from intersecting state highways by La DOTD. The designation is most visible on the exit signage for its interchange with I-49 at Mira.

DeSoto Parish Road 16

DeSoto Parish Road 16 (PR 16) runs  in a general northwest to southeast direction from the junction of I-49 and LA 3276 in Stonewall to LA 175 in Frierson.  It is locally known as Stonewall-Frierson Road.

PR 16 is only signed at the I-49 interchange by La DOTD.

Lincoln Parish Road 106 
Lincoln Parish Road 106 (PR 106) runs 1.59 miles (2.56 km) in a north–south direction from the junction of LA 818 and LA 150 between Grambling and Ruston to LA 544 northwest of Ruston. It is locally known as Tarbutton Road.

PR 106 is signed at its interchange with I-20 west of Ruston. It is also signed by La DOTD immediately north and south of this interchange, though no signage has been posted on the state highways that PR 106 connects to.

PR 106's interchange with I-20 was completed and opened to the public in June 2020. Construction for the $25.5 million project began in 2017 and has been planned as far back at the 1990s. This route was likely signed at the same time with the interchange's construction.

Livingston Parish Road 45

Livingston Parish Road 45 (PR 45) runs  in a north–south direction from LA 42 at Colyell to US 190 at Satsuma.  It is locally known as South Satsuma Road.

PR 45 is only signed at its interchange with I-12 by La DOTD.

Natchitoches Parish Road 547

Natchitoches Parish Road 547 (PR 547) runs  in a general east–west direction from LA 1222 northeast of Robeline to PR 441 (Johnson Chute Road) west of Natchitoches.  It is locally known as Posey Road.

PR 547 is only signed with standard markers at its interchange with I-49 by La DOTD.  However, its number does appear on local street signs next to its local name.

Natchitoches Parish Road 620

Natchitoches Parish Road 620 (PR 620) runs  in an east–west direction from the I-49 frontage road in Natchitoches to PR 615 (Old River Road) south of Natchez.  It is locally known as Flora-Natchez Road.

PR 620 is only signed with standard markers at the junction of LA 478 and Flora-Natchez Road near the former's interchange with I-49.  However, its number does appear on local street signs next to its local name.

The western segment of Flora-Natchez Road, including its intersection with LA 478, was relocated by La DOTD in the 1980s to accommodate the I-49 interchange.  The resulting  road segment is state-maintained and internally designated as a frontage road for I-49, the remainder being the parish-maintained PR 620.

Natchitoches Parish Road 820

Natchitoches Parish Road 820 (PR 820) runs  in a general northwest to southeast direction from Coco Bed Road in Cloutierville to LA 490 in Chopin.  It is locally known as Emmanuel Road.

PR 820 is only signed with standard markers at its junction with LA 490 near an interchange with I-49.  However, its number does appear on local street signs next to its local name.

Natchitoches Parish Road 829

Natchitoches Parish Road 829 (PR 829) runs  in an east–west direction from the junction of LA 493 and Forest Service Road 339 (FS 339) south of Montrose to LA 119 in Derry.  It is locally known as Bayou Derbonne Road.

PR 829 is only signed with standard markers at its junction with LA 119 near an interchange with I-49.  However, its number does appear on local street signs next to its local name.

Ouachita Parish Road 25

Ouachita Parish Road 25 (PR 25) runs  in a general southeast to northwest direction from Cheniere Station Road in Cheniere to US 80 northwest to Cheniere.  It is locally known as Camp Road.

PR 25 is only signed at its interchange with I-20 by La DOTD.

Rapides Parish Road 22

Rapides Parish Road 22 (PR 22) runs  in an east–west direction from the junction of I-49 and LA 3265 in Woodworth to LA 470 east of Woodworth.

PR 22 is only signed at its interchange with I-49 by La DOTD.

Rapides Parish Road 23

Rapides Parish Road 23 (PR 23) runs  in a north–south direction from North Bayou Rapides Road south of Rapides to a dead end north of Rapides.  It is locally known as Rapides Station Road south of Old Boyce Road and as River Road northward.

PR 23 is only signed at its interchange with I-49 by La DOTD.

Richland Parish Road 202

Richland Parish Road 202 (PR 202) runs  in a general southwest to northeast direction from the intersection of Pony Greer Road and Mengel Road southwest of Holly Ridge to the junction of I-20 and LA 183 at Holly Ridge.  It is locally known as McManus Road.

PR 202 is only signed at its interchange with I-20 by La DOTD.

Webster Parish Road 117

Webster Parish Road 117 (PR 117) runs  in a north–south direction from Freight Entrance Road at Camp Minden to Fuller Road north of Camp Minden.  It is locally known as Goodwill Road.

PR 117 is signed by La DOTD at its interchange with I-20 but only on the secondary exit ramp signage.  The route is also signed in a few locations by the Webster Parish Police Jury.

Gallery

See also

References

External links
Maps / GIS Data Homepage, Louisiana Department of Transportation and Development

Parish
 z